Ostrovki is a rural locality (a selo) and the administrative center of Ostrovksoye Rural Settlement, Anninsky District, Voronezh Oblast, Russia. The population was 727 as of 2010. There are 6 streets.

Geography 
Ostrovki is located 40 km east of Anna (the district's administrative centre) by road. Arkhangelskoye is the nearest rural locality.

References 

Rural localities in Anninsky District